Deanolis is a genus of moths of the family Crambidae.

Species
Deanolis iriocapna (Meyrick, 1938)
Deanolis sublimbalis Snellen, 1899

References

Odontiinae
Crambidae genera
Taxa named by Pieter Cornelius Tobias Snellen